Rune Nilssen (born 24 October 1975) is a Norwegian retired football player.

Nilssen previously played for FK Vigør. He joined Start ahead of the 2003 season. In the autumn 2009, Nilssen was on loan at F.C. Copenhagen, without gaining a single game.

References
Club bio

1975 births
Living people
Norwegian footballers
IK Start players
F.C. Copenhagen players
Norwegian expatriate footballers
Expatriate men's footballers in Denmark
Sportspeople from Kristiansand
Association football goalkeepers